The Riley Nine was one of the most successful light sporting cars produced by the British motor industry in the inter war period. It was made by the Riley company of Coventry, England with a wide range of body styles between 1926 and 1938.

Design
The car was largely designed by two of the Riley brothers, Percy and Stanley. Stanley was responsible for the chassis, suspension and body and the older Percy designed the engine.

Engine
The 1,087 cc four-cylinder engine had hemispherical combustion chambers with the valves inclined at 45 degrees in a crossflow head. To save the expense and complication of overhead camshafts, the valves were operated by two camshafts mounted high in the crankcase through short pushrods and rockers. The engine was mounted in the chassis by a rubber bushed bar that ran through the block with a further mount at the rear of the gearbox. Drive was to the rear wheels through a torque tube and spiral bevel live rear axle mounted on semi elliptic springs.

Initially produced with a cone clutch drive train it quickly evolved to have a plate clutch driving through a Silent Third gearbox, then all helical dog change box to an ENV pre-selecta epicyclic gearbox. The engine gradually became stronger, gaining extra webs and internal oil feed to the rockers. The final iteration in the Merlin series gained a single plunger oil pump, replacing the double plunger, and an oil filter amongst many other updates.

Bodies
At launch in July 1926 two body styles were available, a fabric bodied saloon called the Monaco at £285 and a fabric four-seat tourer for £235. The saloon could reach  and give . Very quickly a further two bodies were offered, the San Remo, an artillery wheeled basic saloon and a two-seater plus dickie open tourer and there was also the option of steel panelling rather than fabric for the four-seater tourer.

The thirties saw further models introduced, 1933 being particularly busy, with the 2 door Lynx, Kestrel, and Falcon all appearing. With each year customers demands for more refinement saw the cars get heavier and heavier so that by 1934 the Monaco and Kestrel were of all Aluminium coachbuilt construction. The Lynx gained 4 doors and lost the disappearing hood.

The Riley Imp, a sports version, was produced in the years 1933-1935, and gained quite a reputation, in particular after success in the Ulster Rally, thereafter being known as the Riley Ulster Imp. Kay Petre and Dorothy Champney took 13th place in the 1934 Le Mans race in a Riley Ulster Imp.

Revisions
After the car's 1926 launch, Mark 1 production actually started in 1927 at Percy's engine factory, due to some resistance in the main works to the new design. It was such a critically acclaimed success that after fewer than a thousand cars had been produced the works quickly shut down side-valve production and tooled up for the new Nine in early 1928. This switch to the main factory coincided with several modernisations of the Mark 1 - the cone clutch was dropped, the gear lever and handbrake were moved from the right to the centre of the car and a Riley steering box was adopted, thus making the car the Mark II. The Mark III was a gentle update of the II at the end of 1928, evolving stronger wheels and a different arrangement of rods to the rear brakes.

The Mark IV was a thorough re working of the Nine. Heavier Riley-made 6-stud hubs and axles replaced the bought-in five-stud items. A new cable braking system was introduced with larger drums. The range of bodies was further extended in 1929 with the Biarritz saloon which was a de-luxe version of the Monaco. The improved brakes were fitted using the Riley continuous cable system and if the cable stretched it could be adjusted from the driver's seat.

The Plus series saw the fuel tank moved to the rear of the chassis and an Autovac adopted, whilst the Plus Ultra adopted a new chassis that dropped between the axles, lowering the car. 

More body variants were added over the next few years and in 1934 a Preselector gearbox was offered for £27 extra. The range was slimmed down in 1935 to the Monaco saloon, Kestrel streamlined saloon and Lynx four-seat tourer as the works started gearing up for production of the new 12 hp model.

Steel bodies
In an attempt to keep costs down Riley entered into an agreement with Briggs Manufacturing to produce a steel (non coach-built) body for a newly designed chassis. This new chassis was introduced in 1936 and incorporated such features as Girling rod operated brakes and a prop shaft final drive for the Nine (though the 12 hp variant retained the torque tube). The Briggs body was named the Merlin and was available alongside the last nine Kestrel variant, also built on the "Merlin" chassis. (This body was also used on the narrow track 12/4 chassis as a Falcon, replacing its coachbuilt body.) The Kestrel 9 was also adapted to suit the new Merlin chassis, unfortunately perhaps, also adopting the heavier looking Merlin wings.

The Briggs body evolved through 1937 with a large boot extension to be called the Touring Saloon and an additional body style was added on the same chassis - the higher specified special series Monaco (a completely new design from the previous car). The final version (and last nine model) was the 1938 Victor also available with 1496 cc engine. The Victor had the engine further forward to increase interior room, with the battery moved to the engine bay and smaller diameter wheels were fitted.

The Riley company was bought by Lord Nuffield in 1938 and Nine production ceased as the company pursued a strict two-engine line up, continued after the war with the RM series.

Some catalogued bodies

Some saloons

Open two-seaters

Tourers

Hindsight
When compared with its contemporary Hillman Minx it had a sophisticated 1098 cc engine with hemispherical combustion chambers pumping out more than 25 per cent more horsepower than the 1185 cc Hillman. The Riley's ENV preselector gearbox provided easy progress through the gears. The Riley had a magnificent competition record and was adding to it. The Riley body was composite wood and metal, coachbuilt, and a style-leader — fabric top, centre-lock wire wheels. The pressed steel Hillman body, ordinary. The Minx body rusted, the Monaco body rotted. Hillmans outsold Rileys better than 4.5:1

But a Monaco was nearly double the price of a Minx. While the Monaco's handling was much better there was not a lot of difference in performance, the Minx was even slightly faster in a straight line. With a Riley "special series" twin carburettor engine you might reach 70 mph or 112 km/h. A 1931 Monaco weighed 916 kg, a 1937 model 1 160 kg. In spite of its standard twin carburettors the 1937 Monaco took half a minute to reach 50 mph and could barely exceed 62 mph or 100 km/h.

References

 The Automobile. February 1999. Modern Nines. Jonathan Wood
 The Production and Competition History of the Pre 1939 Riley Motor cars - AT Birmingham

External links

 Photos of Tourer, Biarritz, Monaco and Torpedo models 

Nine
24 Hours of Le Mans race cars
Cars introduced in 1926